The Valea Racilor is a small river in the Apuseni Mountains, Cluj County, western Romania. It is a left tributary of the river Arieș. It flows through the municipalities Feleacu, Tureni and Turda, and joins the Arieș in the town Turda. It is fed by several smaller streams, including the Fâneața Vacilor.

References

Rivers of Romania
Rivers of Cluj County